Sørumsand is a small railway town, situated in Lillestrøm Municipality in Akershus in Norway. Sørumsand was the terminus of Urskog-Hølandsbanen also known as "Tertitten".

Stomperud 
A known figure from Sørumsand (Sørum) is the cartoon character 91 Stomperud which is portrayed at the railway station.

Villages in Akershus